This article provides details of international football games played by the Gabon national football team from 2020 to present.

Results

2020

2021

2022

Forthcoming fixtures
The following matches are scheduled:

References

Football in Gabon
Gabon national football team